The Seven Wonders of Colombia was a 2007 competition sponsored by El Tiempo. The newspaper asked readers to nominate and vote for man-made structures whose engineering, architectural or historical value deserved special recognition.

El Tiempo's Seven Wonders of Colombia

Other finalists

Quinta de San Pedro Alejandrino – 2,783
Zenú Waterworks in Mompox Depression – 2,661
Villa de Leyva's Main Square – 2,598
Puente de Occidente in Santa Fe de Antioquia – 2,476
Santa Bárbara Church in Santa Cruz de Mompox – 2,057
Puerto Colombia's Pier – 1,943
National Museum of Colombia's Building – 1,915
Bolívar Square – 1,894
Ecce Homo Convent, Sutamarchán – 1,849
Barichara's Main Square – 1,822
La Quiebra Tunnel – 1,782
Capitolio Nacional – 1,626
Metropolitan Cathedral of Medellín – 1,624
Museum of Antioquia's Building – 1,191

References

C
Tourist attractions in Colombia